Paxton is a planned light rail station on the Los Angeles County Metro Rail system. The station is part of the East San Fernando Light Rail Project. It is located on San Fernando Road between the base of the northbound California State Route 118 interchange and the intersection with Paxton Street in Pacoima. Metrolink Antelope Valley Line trains pass but will not stop here. It is planned to open as part of the second phase of the project.

References

Future Los Angeles Metro Rail stations
Pacoima, Los Angeles